Macrogastra attenuata is a species of air-breathing land snail, a terrestrial pulmonate gastropod mollusk in the family Clausiliidae, the door snails. 

Subspecies
 Macrogastra attenuata attenuata (Rossmässler, 1835)
 Macrogastra attenuata iriana (Pollonera, 1885)
 Macrogastra attenuata lineolata (Held, 1836)
 Macrogastra attenuata modulata (A. Schmidt, 1856)
 Macrogastra attenuata sabaudina (Bourguignat, 1877)
 Macrogastra attenuata tenuistriata (Pini, 1879)

Distribution
Distribution of this snail include:
 Germany

Description 
The weight of the adult live snail is about 128.7 mg.

References

 Rossmässler, E. A. (1835-1837). Iconographie der Land- & Süßwasser- Mollusken, mit vorzüglicher Berücksichtigung der europäischen noch nicht abgebildeten Arten. (1) 1 (1): VI + 1-132. pl. 1-5 
 Bank, R. A.; Neubert, E. (2017). Checklist of the land and freshwater Gastropoda of Europe. Last update: July 16th, 2017.

External links

Clausiliidae
Gastropods described in 1835